Lander Valley High School (LVHS) is the primary high school located in Lander, Wyoming at 305 Baldwin Creek Rd, Lander, Wyoming 82520. The school is part of the Fremont County District #1. The school district serves Lander and outlying communities including Hudson, Jeffrey City, Atlantic City, and the surrounding area, which also includes Wind River Indian Reservation. The school is accredited by the Wyoming Department of Education and AdvancED (North Central).

History 
The school was originally located near the west end of Main Street, with a nearby field house on Baldwin Creek. In 2004, the old high school was demolished, and the school district built the new one.

Demographics 
Lander Valley High School has 527 students in grades 9–12.  The school district has approximately 1,800 students.

Additional statistics 
LVHS has a 13:1 student-to-teacher ratio.

Total minority enrollment: 31%.

Total economically disadvantaged: 31%.

Full-time teachers: 36.

Percentage of students who are female: 47%.

LVHS has an 82% graduation rate.

Mascot 
The mascot for LVHS is the Tiger, which can be seen at pep rallies and most sporting events. The mascot's name is Tony the Tiger.

Sports programs 
The sports programs at LVHS include: 
 Football
 Basketball – Boys and Girls
 Volleyball – Girls
 Wrestling – Boys
 Swimming – Boys and Girls
 Golf – Boys and Girls
 Cross country skiing – Boys and Girls
 Track – Boys and Girls
 Cross country running – Boys and Girls
 Cricket - Boys and Girls
 Wrassling - all

Additional extracurricular programs 
LVHS has a band, choir, theater program, 4-H club, and FFA.

LVHS also has a wide variety of club programs as well.

Notable alumni 
 Holly Allen — Miss Wyoming USA 2012 winner and contestant on Big Brother 21 (American season)
 Tahnee Robinson WNBA Player

References

External links 
 

Public high schools in Wyoming
Lander, Wyoming
Schools in Fremont County, Wyoming